Nicholas J. "Buddy" Ciotti  was a Chicago Outfit associate and poker machine kingpin. Ciotti was the owner of All Games Amusement Inc., which supplied illegal video gambling machines to several Chicago suburbs, including Stone Park, Northlake, Melrose Park, Franklin Park and River Grove. In 2000 he pleaded guilty in federal court to gambling conspiracy and money laundering charges. He was released from prison on August 2, 2002 and died several months later at the age of 58.

References

1944 births
2003 deaths
American gangsters of Italian descent
Chicago Outfit mobsters
People from Melrose Park, Illinois